Newleon is a genus of cave-dwelling antlions, that is, the genus belongs to the family Myrmeleontidae. 

The genus was first described by Miller and Stange in 2012, who describe them as not being true cave-dwelling antlions, because  not all life stages are confined to caves.

This genus consists of just one species, Newleon fragilis:

References

Myrmeleontidae